Glass Garden (Korean: 유리정원) is a 2017 South Korean mystery drama film directed by Shin Su-won. The film stars Moon Geun-young, Kim Tae-hoon, Seo Tae-hwa, Lim Jung-woon and Park Ji-soo.

Synopsis 
Ph.D. student and researcher Jae-yeon has been studying human photosynthesis in the hopes that humans would no longer be reliant on external air. One day, she retreats to the countryside where she is approached by a novelist who is interested in her research.

Cast 
Moon Geun-young as Jae-yeon
Kim Tae-hoon as Ji-hoon
Seo Tae-hwa as Professor Jeong
Lim Jung-woon
Park Ji-soo as Soo-hee
Lee Ki-hyuk as Sung-nae
Lee Seung-chan as Myeong-ho
Go Eun-chong as Hyeon-woo
Lee Gi-hyeok as Seong-nae
Park Ye-won as Young Jae-yeon
Song Jae-saeng as Si-eun
Kim Joong-ki as Biotech chairman

Release 
Glass Garden was shown at the opening night of the 22nd Busan International Film Festival on October 12, 2017. It was released in theaters on October 25, 2017.

Reception 
The Hollywood Reporter and Variety reviewed the movie, both praising the way the film was shot, with The Hollywood Reporter highlighting the performance of Moon Geun-young.

Awards and nominations

References

External links 

2017 films
2010s mystery drama films
South Korean mystery drama films
2017 drama films
2010s South Korean films